László Bartók (1904 – 8 April 1945) was a Hungarian rower. He competed at the 1928 Summer Olympics in Amsterdam with the men's coxed four where they were eliminated in the round two repechage. After retiring from competition, Bartók worked as a trainer at the Danube Rowing Association of Budapest.

László Bartók was the oldest son of a large Hungarian family.  His father was Bernat Bela Bartók (a bank director) and his mother was Joland Schweiger. He had two sisters and two brothers (Maria, Lucy, Stephen, and Denis). He was fluent in Hungarian, German, English, and Italian. László was married and had three children.

He was murdered in the Holocaust in Buchenwald on 8 April 1945. The camp was liberated three days later. The fate of his wife and three children remains unknown.

References

1904 births
1945 deaths
Hungarian male rowers
Olympic rowers of Hungary
Rowers at the 1928 Summer Olympics
Rowers from Budapest
European Rowing Championships medalists
Hungarian people who died in Buchenwald concentration camp
Hungarian civilians killed in World War II
20th-century Hungarian people